Burt County is a county in the U.S. state of Nebraska, bordering the west bank of the upper Missouri River. As of the 2010 United States Census, the population was 6,858. Its county seat is Tekamah. The county was formed in 1854 and named after Francis Burt, the first governor of Nebraska Territory.

In the Nebraska license plate system, Burt County is represented by the prefix 31 (it had the 31st-largest number of vehicles registered in the county when the license plate system was established in 1922).

Geography
Its east boundary line is formed by the western border of the state of Iowa, a boundary mostly aligning with the Missouri River. Because of shifts in the river over time, small portions of the county are now located on the eastern bank of the river.

Major highways

  U.S. Highway 75
  U.S. Highway 77
  Nebraska Highway 32
  Nebraska Highway 51

Adjacent counties

 Thurston County - north
 Monona County, Iowa - northeast
 Harrison County, Iowa - southeast
 Washington County - south
 Dodge County - southwest
 Cuming County - west

Demographics

As of the 2020 United states Census, The racial makeup of the county was 92.2% non-Hispanic white, .3% African American, 1.1% native American, .5% Asian, and 2.6% Hispanic.

As of the 2000 United States Census, there were 7,791 people, 3,155 households, and 2,240 families in the county. The population density was 16 people per square mile (6/km2). There were 3,723 housing units at an average density of 8 per square mile (3/km2). The racial makeup of the county was 97.63% White, 0.18% Black or African American, 1.07% Native American, 0.19% Asian, 0.03% Pacific Islander, 0.22% from other races, and 0.69% from two or more races. 1.26% of the population were Hispanic or Latino of any race. 33.7% were of German, 13.9% Swedish, 10.1% Irish, 8.8% American, 7.0% English and 5.4% Danish ancestry according to Census 2000.

There were 3,155 households, out of which 29.50% had children under the age of 18 living with them, 61.30% were married couples living together, 6.20% had a female householder with no husband present, and 29.00% were non-families. 26.50% of all households were made up of individuals, and 15.60% had someone living alone who was 65 years of age or older. The average household size was 2.43 and the average family size was 2.93.

The county population contained 25.70% under the age of 18, 5.40% from 18 to 24, 23.40% from 25 to 44, 23.80% from 45 to 64, and 21.80% who were 65 years of age or older. The median age was 42 years. For every 100 females there were 93.80 males. For every 100 females age 18 and over, there were 91.80 males.

The median income for a household in the county was $33,954, and the median income for a family was $40,515. Males had a median income of $28,750 versus $20,663 for females. The per capita income for the county was $16,654. About 6.60% of families and 8.90% of the population were below the poverty line, including 11.80% of those under age 18 and 8.30% of those age 65 or over.

Communities

Cities
 Lyons
 Oakland
 Tekamah (county seat)

Villages
 Craig
 Decatur

Unincorporated communities
 Arizona
 Bertha

Townships

 Arizona
 Bell Creek
 Craig
 Decatur
 Everett
 Logan
 Oakland
 Pershing
 Quinnebaugh
 Riverside
 Silver Creek
 Summit

Ghost towns
 Argo
 Basford
 Golden

Politics
Burt County voters have historically voted Republican. No Democratic Party candidate has carried the county in a national election since 1936.

See also
National Register of Historic Places listings in Burt County, Nebraska

References

 
Nebraska counties on the Missouri River
1854 establishments in Nebraska Territory
Populated places established in 1854